Nikodim Milaš (1845–1915) was a Serbian Orthodox Church bishop in Dalmatia (nowaday Croatia). He was a writer and arguably the greatest Serbian expert on Orthodox church law and the Slavic world. As a canon lawyer in Dalmatia, he defended the Serbian Orthodox Church against the State. He was a polyglot, fluent in German, Italian, Latin, Russian, Greek, and Old Slavonic, and an author of numerous books.

Biography
Bishop Nikodim Milaš was born at Šibenik in Kingdom of Dalmatia (then part of the Austro-Hungarian Empire) on 4 April 1845, as an illegitimate son of Serb Orthodox father Trifun Milaš from Vrlika and Italian Catholic mother Maria Valmassoni from Šibenik. He was first baptized, as Nikola, in Roman Catholic church, and three years later in Orthodox church. After attending the Jesuit Gymnasium in Zadar and graduating from the Serbian Orthodox Theological School at Sremski Karlovci, he studied at the oldest college of the Russian Orthodox Church, the Kievan Theological Academy and Seminary (then part of Imperial Russia), and in 1871 took a master's degree in Canon Law and Church History, the fruit of which, his remarkable dissertation, Nomocanon of Patriarch Photius, brought him the golden cross of the Russian Orthodox Church. Upon his return home, Serbian Orthodox Bishop Stefan (Knežević) of Dalmatia appointed him professor of canon law at Zadar's Theological Orthodox Institute. In 1872, he published a study in which he criticized the Austro-Hungarian government for interfering in the life of the Serbian Orthodox Church and its faithful.

Professor Nikola Milaš was tonsured in 1873 and given the monastic name of Nikodim. Also, he was ordained deacon, and two years later, presbyter. He received the rank archimandrite in 1880. Under his administration, the theological institute in Zadar became one of the best Orthodox schools. Nikodim corresponded with the greatest Eastern Orthodox and Roman Catholic canonists at the time: Alexis Stepanovich Pavloff (d. 1898), Alexander Theodorovich Lavroff, Vasili Vasilievich Bolotoff, Pietro Gasparri, Emil Albert Friedberg, Joseph Putzer, Friedrich Heinrich Vering. After the publication of his (hornbook), "Principles of Jurisdiction in the Eastern Orthodox Church," in which he again leveled criticism on the Austro-Hungarian authorities, he was forced to take refuge in Belgrade in late 1885. Therefore, the next two years, he was the rector of the Belgrade Seminary (Bogoslovija). 

In early 1888 he was back in Zadar where he completed that same year two major works: "Roman Catholic Propaganda: its foundation and rules today" (1889) and his six-volume treatise on the Serbian Orthodox Church entitled "Orthodox Church and Canon Law" (1890). He liked Zadar, and the people would have been glad to keep him, but the attraction of a Belgrade post carried him back there in the Autumn of 1888. He was appointed Professor of Canon law and Church History at the Belgrade's Grande école (Velika škola) and Bogoslovija, the Theological Seminary. Two years later, when Bishop Stefan Knežević of Dalmatia died, Nikodim was elected Bishop of Dalmatia on 10 July 1890 and consecrated on 16 September 1890. Throughout his tenure, he was under pressure from anti-Serb Orthodox authorities and forced to endure aggressive Roman Catholic proselytism. Bishop Nikodim collaborated with politicians Sava Bjelanović during that period.

In 1901 Nikodim published "Orthodoxy in Dalmatia" in answer to a papal encyclical in which Pope Leo XIII appealed for the union. His book was criticized by the bishop of the Eparchy of Križevci.

Nikodim also had problems with his superiors. He refused elevation to the Holy Synod (the executive body of the Serbian Orthodox Church) of Belgrade and later of Sarajevo because he was not elected according to canon law. Always under constant pressure from civil authorities and other enemies, Nikodim was forced to retire from the position of Bishop of Dalmatia in early 1912. It is considered that retired due to the scandal surrounding the embezzlement of the money and other goods of the Orthodox municipality. He was succeeded by Bishop Dimitrije Branković.

Bishop Nikodim died at Dubrovnik on 12 April 1915. The only copy of his new book – "The Church and the State in the Austro-Hungarian Empire"—has since disappeared.

Legacy
Nikodim Milaš grew up in a region where jurisprudence was founded on Roman and Byzantine law. His extensive and exact legal erudition, and the skill with which he wrote about the complex canonical laws, soon brought him a reputation never before equaled and caused him to be universally recognized as the greatest Eastern Orthodox canon lawyer of his day. Most of his work was translated into Russian, German, Romanian, Bulgarian and Greek, and has greatly influenced modern Orthodox canonists, including I. Bogović, C. Metrović, Professor S. Troitsky (the Russian-Serbian canonist), Branko Cisarž (d. 1982), and Dimsho Perić (d. 2007), who wrote studies on the history of church-state relations in Serbia. Nikodim produced a number of collections of canonical texts and was particularly interested in the churches of North Africa in the Roman period. He translated The Constitution (Syntagma) of the Divine and Sacred Canons by Rallis and Potlis, and placed his commentaries in the context of previous Biblical hermeneutic works. He was largely active on the matter of Church-State relations, a subject which preoccupied most of his work.

Related to the romantic nationalism and Greater Serbia ideology of the time, Milaš in his work about the history of Dalmatia, invented various historical stories and accounts about the pre-Ottoman presence of Serbs and foundation of Serb Orthodox monasteries in Dalmatia (Dragović, Krka, Krupa) which plagues historiographies, especially Serbian, even today. Among his controversial claims are that Orthodoxy can be traced in Dalmatia since Apostolic Age, Serbs settled in Dalmatia in the 4th century, arrived there before the Croats, the region was ethnically Serbian until the 9th-11th century when Croatian rulers "imposed Catholicism and Croatism on the Serbs", that the Serbs re-settled Dalmatia in the 13th century, the Vlachs of Croatia since the 15th century represented a new wave of Serbs, during Ottoman time Dalmatia was exclusively settled by Serbs, among others. He was also highly critical and made heavy accusations against the pope and Roman church, claiming that the Croats initially were Orthodox Christians, and sacral heritage of Split was part of Serbian Orthodox heritage as well. He also shared Vuk Karadžić's viewpoint that all speakers of Shtokavian dialect are ethnic Serbs. Such ideas and claims were used as arguments and justification for Greater Serbian pretensions during the Yugoslav Wars.

He is included in The 100 most prominent Serbs.

On October 2, 2012, he was locally glorified as a saint by the Diocese of Dalmatia of the Serbian Orthodox Church.

Selected works
 Historical-Canonical view on establishment of Serbo-Romanian Metropolis of Bukovina and Dalmatia (1873);
  Clerical dignities in the Orthodox Church (1879);
  Codex canonum ecclesiae africane (1881);
  St. Sava's Kormchya Book (1884);
  Das Synodal-Statut der orth. Oriental Metropolie der Bukowina i Dalmatien mit Erläuterungen (1885);
  Orthodox Church and Canon Law in six volumes (first edition 1890; second revised edition 1890, translated in Russian 1897, in German 1897, in Bulgarian 1903);
  Roman Catholic Propaganda, its foundation and rules today (1889; translated in Russian 1889, and in Bulgarian 1890);
  Orthodoxy in Dalmatia, a historical perspective (1901);
  Question of Eastern Church and task of Austria in it (1889; 1890 translated in Romanian and German);
  Principles of jurisdiction in Orthodox Church
  Orthodox Monasticism (Mostar 1902);
  Slavic Apostles Ss. Cyril and Methodius
  Rules (Κανόνες) of Orthodox Church with commentary (I 1895, II 1896)
   (I, 1899),

See also
 Serbian Orthodox Church
 History of the Serbian Orthodox Church

References

1845 births
1915 deaths
Bishops of Šibenik
Bishops in the Kingdom of Dalmatia
Serbs of Croatia
Eparchy of Dalmatia
Serbian Orthodox Church in Croatia
19th-century Eastern Orthodox bishops
Serbian theologians
20th-century Serbian historians
19th-century Serbian historians
Christian writers
Academic staff of Belgrade Higher School
Bishops of the Serbian Orthodox Church
Austro-Hungarian Serbs
Austro-Hungarian emigrants to the Russian Empire